Strobilos was a town of ancient Bithynia. It is not mentioned by any ancient authors, but appears in epigraphic and other evidence.

Its site is located near Çiftlik in Asiatic Turkey.

References

Populated places in Bithynia
Former populated places in Turkey
History of Yalova Province